Saï is a large island in the Nile River in Nubia between the second and third cataracts, in the country of Sudan. It is 12 km long and 5.5 km wide. Saï was intermittently occupied by the Egyptians during the New Kingdom. In the Makurian period it was the center of a bishopric, while in the second half of the 16th century the Ottomans founded a fortress on the island.

The northeast portion of the island contains a New Kingdom of Egypt temple and numerous mills associated with ancient gold production.  Nearby is an Ottoman Empire fort composed of sandstone quarried along the river banks, and spolia bearing the cartouche of Amenhotep IV, amongst other 18th Dynasty rulers.  Numerous round tombs are close by.

See also
Arabian-Nubian Shield
Nubian Sandstone

References

External links
 The Island of Saï
 Medieval Sai Project

Nubia
River islands of Sudan
Islands of the Nile